Denis Lenaghan (born 18 November 1956) is a former Australian rules footballer who played with Carlton and Geelong in the Victorian Football League (VFL).

Notes

External links 

Denis Lenaghan's profile at Blueseum

1956 births
Carlton Football Club players
Geelong Football Club players
Sandhurst Football Club players
Australian rules footballers from Victoria (Australia)
Living people